The International Action Center (IAC) is an activist group founded in 1992 by former United States Attorney General Ramsey Clark. It supports anti-imperialist movements around the world, and opposes U.S. military intervention in all circumstances.

The IAC has offices in major cities including New York City, Washington, D.C., San Francisco and Boston. The IAC share a considerable overlap with members of the Workers World Party.

Leftist political and anti-colonialist issues in Iraq, Palestine, Haiti, Cuba, Latin America, the Philippines, Korea and elsewhere around the world are of particular interest to the IAC.

After the September 11, 2001 attacks, IAC initiated the A.N.S.W.E.R. Coalition, which helped to organize several massive rallies in opposition to the U.S. invasion of Iraq, for a time in loose partnership with United for Peace and Justice. After a split in the Workers World Party, the leadership of ANSWER separated from the IAC. For their part, the IAC initiated the Troops Out Now Coalition to oppose the war.

The IAC sent a delegation to the Central African Republic to secure the release of the Haitian president, Jean Bertrand Aristide, after he was removed from power by a coup in February 2004.

The IAC regularly organizes rallies, conferences and other events to support human rights and in opposition to imperialism and "corporate oppression."

The IAC publishes books on topical matters, including books on the effect of United Nations sanctions on the people of Iraq, The Fire This Time, by Ramsey Clark; a history of Haiti, Haiti: A Slave Revolution; and a book on the effects of the use of depleted uranium in warfare, Poison Dust.

External links
 International Action Center homepage
 Hear Richard Becker, the Western Region Co-Director of the International Action Center Audio in Sacramento, CA on Feb. 20, 2008

Workers World Party
Political advocacy groups in the United States